David John Banfield  (25 June 1933 – 2 October 2014)  was Archdeacon of Bristol from 1990 until 1998.

Banfield was educated at Yeovil School  and the London College of Divinity. He was ordained deacon in 1957 and priest in 1958 . After a curacy in Middleton, Greater Manchester he was the Chaplain of Scargill House from  1962 to 1967. He was Vicar of Addiscombe; then Luton before his Archdeacon’s appointment.

References

1933 births
People educated at Yeovil School
Alumni of the London College of Divinity
Archdeacons of Bristol
2014 deaths